Coker University is a private university in Hartsville, South Carolina. It was founded in 1908 and is accredited by the Southern Association of Colleges and Schools. Coker's sports teams, nicknamed the Cobras, compete in NCAA Division II.

History

Coker University began in 1894 as Welsh Neck High School, founded by a local businessman and American Civil War veteran, Major James Lide Coker (1837–1918). In 1908, when South Carolina created a statewide public school system, Coker led the effort to convert the school to Coker College for Women. Davidson Hall and Memorial Hall are listed on the National Register of Historic Places.

Coker was once affiliated with the South Carolina Baptist Convention, but has been non-denominational since 1944. It officially became co-educational in 1969, although men had been attending since the end of World War II.

The South Carolina Governor's School for Science and Mathematics was located on the Coker campus from 1988 until moving to its own campus in 2003.

Effective July 1, 2019, Coker College adopted the name Coker University.

Presidents
James Lide Coker
Dr. E. V. Baldy (1909–1911)
Dr. Arthur Jackson Hall (1911–1914)
Dr. Howard Lee Jones (1914–1915)
Dr. E. Walter Sikes (1916–1925)
Dr. Carlyle Campbell (1925–1936)
Dr. C. Sylvester Green (1936–1944)
Dr. Donald C. Agnew (1944–1952)
Dr. Joseph C. Robert (1952–1955)
Dr. John A. Barry, Jr. (1955–1959)
Dr. Fenton Keyes (1960–1968)
Dr. Wilfrid H. Callcott (1968–1969)
Dr. Gus Turbeville (1969–1974)
Dr. C. Hilburn Womble (1975–1980)
Dr. James D. Daniels (1981–2002)
Dr. B. James Dawson (2002–2009)
Dr. Robert L. Wyatt (2009–2019)
Dr. Natalie Harder (2020- )

Academics
Coker refers to the academic program for the four-year undergraduate degree as the Trans4mations Program, with the first year being foundational, the second year requiring service and attendance at cultural events, the third year requiring at least two weeks of study off-campus, and the final year called a "capstone". The Liberal Arts Studies Program (LASP) is divided into Core Skills, Knowledge of the Arts, Knowledge of the Behavioral Sciences, Knowledge of the Humanities, Knowledge of the Natural Sciences, Knowledge of the United States, and Knowledge of the Wider World.

Coker offers 29 majors and 23 minors of study. The college also offers individual majors and double majors, self-designated degree programs, specializations and pre-professional programs.

Campus
The  main campus contains mostly Georgian-style brick buildings, some of which (such as Davidson Hall, home to the college's round table classrooms) are listed on the National Register of Historic Places. The Alumni House (Drengaelen), The President's House, The Dean's and President's Offices (David and May Coker House) and The Registrar's Offices (Lawton-Wilson House) are all located in old mansions along the northern edge of campus.

Hartsville and Coker University owe much to the generosity of the Coker family, founders of Sonoco and Coker's Pedigreed Seed Company.  The Coker family's patronage of the college has led to the vast majority of buildings on campus having Coker somewhere in the name.  Students often joke to freshmen or visitors that they'll meet them "in the Coker" building as a way to gently initiate newcomers to campus.

Residence halls
On-campus residence halls include Memorial (1914), Belk (1916), Coker (1916) and Grannis (1969), which all adjoin the Linville Dining Hall (1916). Richard and Tuck Coker Hall (1988), commonly called the RTC, and James Lide Coker III (2009) occupy separate buildings near Memorial Hall. Most of the older residence halls have been remodeled since 2005 and are fully modernized. A new residence hall, the Betty Y. and Charles L. Sullivan Jr. Residence Hall at The Village at Byerly Place, opened in 2013. In 2011, Coker opened the Coker Downtown Lofts and in 2012 the Downtown Flats, both located just off campus in downtown Hartsville.  The Dining Hall, with services provided by Sodexo, offers cafeteria-style dining with several options (including vegetarian selections) at each meal.  Memorial Hall houses the Drawing Room, a ballroom/dining hall for special events.

Library
In January 2008, students began using the  Charles W. and Joan S. Coker Library-Information Technology Center.  The new library was built entirely from donations from a capital campaign and is an example of Coker alumni generosity to the college. The former James Lide Coker Memorial Library is now James Lide Coker Memorial Residence Hall.

Athletics
Adjacent to the main campus is a 22-acre athletics complex with baseball, softball, soccer and tennis facilities. Near the athletics complex is the DeLoach Center, which contains a 1,908 seat gymnasium, an auxiliary gym, interactive classrooms, a student-athlete only weight room, a fitness center, athletic offices and more.

The college has 21 varsity athletics programs, which compete in The South Atlantic Conference. They include Women's Basketball, Men's Basketball, Baseball, Softball, Women's Volleyball, Men's Lacrosse, Women's Lacrosse, Women's Tennis, Men's Tennis, Women's Golf, Men's Golf, Women's Soccer, Men's Soccer, Women's Field Hockey, Women's Cross Country, Men's Cross Country, Women's Track and Field (Indoor/Outdoor), Men's Track and Field (Indoor/Outdoor), and Wrestling.

In the 2013 season the Coker baseball team won the Conference Carolinas Tournament title, earned the team's first-ever postseason bid, won the NCAA Southeast Regional and advanced to the NCAA DII Baseball National Championship. They finished the year with a record of 38–16.

Notable alumni
Bonnie Ethel Cone, founder of University of North Carolina at Charlotte
Terrance Hayes, poet
Patrick Earl Hammie, artist
Harvey Hilbert, psychologist and expert on post-Vietnam stress syndrome
Marian McKnight, Miss America 1957
Ruth Patrick, botanist and limnologist
James McBride Dabbs, author and civil rights activist
Edith Mitchell Dabbs, author

See also
 Davidson Hall, Coker College
 Memorial Hall

References

External links

 

 
Private universities and colleges in South Carolina
Liberal arts colleges in South Carolina
Educational institutions established in 1908
Education in Darlington County, South Carolina
Universities and colleges accredited by the Southern Association of Colleges and Schools
Buildings and structures in Hartsville, South Carolina
1908 establishments in South Carolina
Hartsville, South Carolina